× Odontocidium, abbreviated as Odcdm. in the horticultural trade, is the nothogenus comprising intergeneric hybrids of the two orchid genera Odontoglossum and Oncidium (Odm. x Onc.). Many orchids formerly classified as × Colmanara have been reclassified as × Odontocidium by the American Orchid Society.

What is Odontocidium?==References==

Orchid nothogenera
Oncidiinae
Historically recognized angiosperm taxa